Assia Raziki (born 4 October 1996) is a Moroccan sprinter.

She won the bronze medal in the women's 200 metres event at the 2015 Arab Athletics Championships held in Isa Town, Bahrain.

In 2017, she won four gold medals at the Arab Athletics Championships held in Radès, Tunisia. Two years later, at the 2019 Arab Athletics Championships held in Cairo, Egypt, she won a silver and a bronze medal.

She finished fourth in the 100 metres and won a bronze medal in the 400 metres at the 2017 Jeux de la Francophonie, and finished fifth in the 200 metres at the 2017 Islamic Solidarity Games. She also competed at the 2014 African Championships, the 2016 African Championships and the 2018 Mediterranean Games without reaching the final.

She competed in the women's 200 metres and women's 400 metres events at the 2019 African Games held in Rabat, Morocco.

References

External links 
 

Living people
1996 births
Place of birth missing (living people)
Moroccan female sprinters
Athletes (track and field) at the 2018 Mediterranean Games
Athletes (track and field) at the 2022 Mediterranean Games
Mediterranean Games bronze medalists for Morocco
Mediterranean Games medalists in athletics
Athletes (track and field) at the 2019 African Games
African Games competitors for Morocco
Islamic Solidarity Games competitors for Morocco
Islamic Solidarity Games medalists in athletics
20th-century Moroccan women
21st-century Moroccan women